Akmolinsk Oblast was an oblast (province) of the Russian Empire. It roughly corresponded to most of present-day northern Kazakhstan and the southern part of Omsk Oblast in Russia. It was formerly part of Kazakh khanate. It was created after the division of the Oblast of Siberia Kyrgyz into the oblasts Aqmola and Semirechye on 21 October 1868. Its center was Omsk and consisted of uezds Akmolinsk, Atbasar, Kokchetav, Omsk and Petropavlovsk. It bordered Tobolsk Governorate to the north, Semipalatinsk Oblast to the east, Semirechye Oblast to the northeast, Syr-Darya Oblast to the south, Turgay Oblast to the southwest and Orenburg Governorate to the northwest.

Demographics
As of 1897, 682,608 people populated the oblast. Kazakhs constituted the majority of the population. Significant minorities consisted of Russians and Ukrainians. Total Turkic speaking were 438,889 (64.2%).

Ethnic groups in 1897 

After the defeat of the White Army in the Russian Civil War, it was renamed as Omsk Governorate on 3 January 1920.

References

 
Oblasts of the Russian Empire
Kazakhstan in the Russian Empire